Maria Parr (born 18 January 1981 in Vanylven) is a Norwegian children's writer.

She studied Nordic Languages and Literature at the University of Bergen. She currently teaches part-time at the high school in Vanylven.

Her children's books include Vaffelhjarte (2005) (published in English as Waffle Hearts in 2013), Tonje Glimmerdal (2009) (published in English as Astrid the unstoppable in 2018) and Keeperen og havet (2017) (published in English as Lena, the Sea, and Me in 2017), among others. She has won the Brage Prize twice, in 2009 and 2017. She received the Nynorsk User of the Year award in 2010.

Works 

 2005: Vaffelhjarte – translated into English as Waffle Hearts (2013)
 2009: Tonje Glimmerdal – translated into English as Astrid the unstoppable (2018)
 2017: Keeperen og havet – translated into English as Lena, the Sea, and Me (2020)
 2019: Storebror

Awards 

 2005: Nynorsk Children's Book Award for Waffle Hearts
 2006: Ole Vig Award for Astrid the unstoppable
 2009: Brage Prize for Astrid the unstoppable
 2010: Critics Prize for the year's best children's literature for Astrid the unstoppable
 2010: Nynorsk User of the Year
 2013: Sigmund Skard Fellowship
 2017: Brage Prize for Lena, the Sea, and Me
 2018: Sultprisen (Sult Award) 
 2018: Norwegian School Librarians Association Literature Award

References

1981 births
Living people
Norwegian children's writers
People from Møre og Romsdal
Norwegian Critics Prize for Literature winners
University of Bergen alumni